Nomura Dam is a gravity dam located in Ehime Prefecture in Japan. The dam is used for flood control, irrigation and water supply. The catchment area of the dam is 168 km2. The dam impounds about 95  ha of land when full and can store 16000 thousand cubic meters of water. The construction of the dam was started on 1971 and completed in 1981.

References

Dams in Ehime Prefecture
1981 establishments in Japan